Anderman is a surname. Notable people with the surname include:

 Maureen Anderman (born 1946), American actress
 Sig Anderman (born 1941), American businessman

See also
 Frederick Andermann
 Heinz Rein  (pseudonym: Reinhard Andermann)